The Siloid languages belong to the Southern Loloish (Hanoish) branch of the Sino-Tibetan language family. The Siloid branch was first proposed by Hsiu (2016).

Most Siloid languages are spoken in Phongsaly Province, northern Laos, with smaller numbers of speakers living in China (Yunnan) and Vietnam (Lai Châu Province).

Languages
The Siloid languages are:

Sila
Khir
Cosao
Paza
Phana’
Wanyä
Akeu
Gokhy

Classification
The internal classifications of Siloid languages were analyzed in a 2016 computational phylogenetic lexical analysis by Hsiu (2016).
Siloid
Wanyä
(core branch)
Phusang
Khir, Cosao
Sila (Sida)

The Siloid classification above was subsequently revised by Hsiu (2018) as follows.
Siloid
Luma, Pala
Akeu, Gokhy
Wanyä (Muchi)
Sila cluster:
Sila, Sida
Paza (Phusang)
Khir, Cosao
Phana

References

Lama, Ziwo Qiu-Fuyuan (2012), Subgrouping of Nisoic (Yi) Languages, thesis, University of Texas at Arlington (archived)
Kingsadā, Thō̜ngphet, and Tadahiko Shintani. 1999 Basic Vocabularies of the Languages Spoken in Phongxaly, Lao P.D.R. Tokyo: Institute for the Study of Languages and Cultures of Asia and Africa (ILCAA).
Shintani, Tadahiko, Ryuichi Kosaka, and Takashi Kato. 2001. Linguistic Survey of Phongxaly, Lao P.D.R. Tokyo: Institute for the Study of Languages and Cultures of Asia and Africa (ILCAA).
Kato, Takashi. 2008. Linguistic Survey of Tibeto-Burman languages in Lao P.D.R. Tokyo: Institute for the Study of Languages and Cultures of Asia and Africa (ILCAA).